The use of solar power at the White House was first introduced during the Carter administration under President Jimmy Carter in 1979. Carter's solar panels were removed during the Reagan administration in 1986. Solar power was reintroduced during the Bush and Obama administrations in the 21st-century.

Background
Mechanical engineer Fred Morse was approached by the Nixon administration to assess the potential of solar power. He took several years to work out what could be installed on the roof of the White House. The panels could not alter or change the look of the house, and were ultimately white as opposed to a darker colour for aesthetic reasons.

The need for alternative sources of energy than fossil fuels and energy independence grew in the wake of the oil crises of 1973 and 1979.  Carter's reviewing stand for his inauguration was warmed by solar panels. The Carter administration increased the budget for the development of energy technology research and introduced tax credits for solar power.

Carter administration
On 20 June 1979, 32 solar water heating panels were placed on the roof of the West Wing of the White House. The panels were made by InterTechnology/Solar Corp. from Warrenton, Virginia and installed by Hector Guevara of Alternate Energy Industries Corp. At the dedication ceremony for the panels President Jimmy Carter said that "In the year 2000 this solar water heater behind me, which is being dedicated today, will still be here supplying cheap, efficient energy ... A generation from now, this solar heater can either be a curiosity, a museum piece, an example of a road not taken or it can be just a small part of one of the greatest and most exciting adventures ever undertaken by the American people". 

The panels provided almost 75 percent of the energy to heat 1,000 gallons of water in the staff kitchen of the White House. The installation cost $35,000. Carter's administration had set a goal for renewable energy in the United States to generate 20% of the nation's energy needs by the year 2000. Tax breaks for solar panels were eliminated under the administration of President Ronald Reagan, Carter's successor. By 2013, 7% of US energy needs were derived from renewable sources. 0.1% of that energy was generated from solar power.

Removal under the Reagan administration
The panels were removed in 1986 during the Reagan administration during the resurfacing of the roof, and stored in a warehouse in Franconia, Virginia. 

An official from Unity College, a private college in New Gloucester, Maine asked that they be released to them, and they were moved to the college in an old school bus and installed in 1992. The panels were used to reheat water for the college's dining hall. The college received a letter from Carter expressing his happiness at their installation. In October 2004 the college planned to auction the solar panels as they had become outdated.

Three of the panels are part of museum collections. One of the panels was donated by Unity College to the National Museum of American History in 2009. Another is on display at the Jimmy Carter Presidential Center. A third panel has been part of the Solar Science and Technology Museum in Dezhou, China since 2013.

21st century
In 2003, the Bush administration reinstalled solar thermal heaters. These units are used to heat water for landscape maintenance personnel and for the presidential pool and spa. One hundred sixty-seven solar photovoltaic grid-tied panels were installed at the same time on the roof of the maintenance facility. The changes were not publicized, as a White House spokeswoman said the changes were an internal matter. The story was picked up by industry trade journals.

In 2010, the United States Secretary of Energy in the Obama administration, Steven Chu, announced that solar panels would be reinstalled on the roof saying that "As we move towards a clean energy economy, the White House will lead by example". The panels were installed in 2013, making it the first time solar power would be used for the president's living quarters.

References

1979 in American politics
1979 in Washington, D.C.
Presidency of Jimmy Carter
Solar power in the United States
White House